Morris Creek may refer to:

Morris Creek (South Dakota)
Morris Creek Wildlife Management Area, a protected area in West Virginia